Bryce Ava Wettstein (born January 10, 2004 in Encinitas, California) is a regular-footed American skateboarder.

Skateboarding
Wettstein has been skating and surfing since she was 5 years old. In the 2017 Vans Park Series, Wettstein placed 2nd after a run that scored: 83.43. She finished behind Brighton Zeuner's 84.69 and ahead of Nora Vasconcellos's 82.36. In 2018, Bryce placed 2nd at Dew Tour Women’s Pro Park, finishing behind Nicole Hause and ahead of Jordyn Barratt. Wettstein is among the 16 members of the inaugural U.S.A Skateboarding National Team announced in March, 2019.  Wettstein won the 2019 National Championship for Women's Park held at CATF.  Wettstein qualified for the 2020 Tokyo Olympic Games and competed in the women’s park event. She placed sixth overall.

References

External links
 
 
  at The Boardr

2004 births
Living people
American skateboarders
American sportswomen
Female skateboarders
Olympic skateboarders of the United States
People from Encinitas, California
Skateboarders at the 2020 Summer Olympics
Sportspeople from California
X Games athletes
21st-century American women